Elizabeth Teresa "Terry" Burnham (August 8, 1949 – October 7, 2013) was an American actress, best known for her performance in the Twilight Zone episode, "Nightmare as a Child."

Life and career
Elizabeth Teresa Burnham was born on August 8, 1949, in Los Angeles, the younger of two children born to Guy Calvin Burnham, an aeronautics engineer at Douglas Aircraft Company, and Elizabeth Teresa Buelna Symons.  She attended St. Maria Goretti Catholic School, St. Cornelius School, Mark Twain Middle School, and Bancroft Junior High School.

On December 22, 1955, Burnham made her television debut at age six alongside Brandon De Wilde in the series Climax!, in an episode entitled "The Day They Gave the Babies Away" (based on the 1946 novel of the same title that was also the basis for the 1957 film All Mine to Give). More prominent roles soon followed, most notably in 1957 with "Let There Be Light", an episode of the series M Squad co-starring Burnham and series regular Lee Marvin, whom Terry later singled out as her favorite actor. Also that year, Burnham was set to star in a new child-centered series, Turquoise, Inc., whose writer/producers Dick Chevillat and Ray Singer touted her as "TV's first Shirley Temple". Although that projected series never materialized, Burnham did appear, almost exactly one year later, on an episode of Temple's own series entitled "The Magic Fishbone", adapted by Margaret Fitts from the Charles Dickens short story.

Burnham first attracted national attention as the daughter of Lana Turner's character in Imitation of Life (1959).

Death
On October 7, 2013, Terry Burnham died of a cardiac arrest. With no surviving next of kin, her unclaimed cremated remains were stored at Los Angeles County Crematorium. On August 8, 2018, which would have been her 69th birthday, Burnham's ashes were buried at Forest Lawn Memorial Park in Long Beach.

Filmography

References

Further reading
 "L.B. Girl, 8, in Air Series". Long Beach Independent. May 1, 1958. p. 22 
 "Dance Maestro". The Nashville Tennessean. December 25, 1966. p. 65
 "The Face That Launched a Thousand Slurps". The Bradenton Herald. April 30, 1967. p. 21

External links
 
 Elizabeth Teresa Burnham on Facebook

1949 births
2013 deaths
20th-century American actresses
21st-century American women
American child actresses
American film actresses
Actresses from Long Beach, California
Actresses from Los Angeles
People from Lakewood, California